A rift lake is a lake formed as a result of subsidence related to movement on faults within a rift zone, an area of extensional tectonics in the continental crust. They are often found within rift valleys and may be very deep. Rift lakes may be bounded by large steep cliffs along the fault margins.

Examples

 Lake Baikal, in Siberia
 Lake Balaton, in Hungary
 The Dead Sea, on the border of Israel, Palestine and Jordan, a pull-apart basin, formed along the Dead Sea Transform.
 Ebi Lake in China at the Dzungarian Gate on the border with Kazakhstan 
 Lake Elsinore, in the Elsinore Trough in Southern California
 Lake Hazar, in Turkey
 Lake Idaho, a Pliocene rift lake in Idaho
 Lake Khuvsgul, northern Mongolia
 Limagne, an infilled Paleogene rift lake in France
 Lake Lockatong, a rift lake of Triassic age, formed in the Newark Basin.
 Lake Malawi, part of East African Rift
 The Orcadian Basin, in northern Scotland, had rift lakes that formed during the Middle Devonian.
 Rift Valley lakes, eastern Africa
 The Salton Sea, in Southern California
 Lake Tanganyika, part of Albertine Rift
 Lake Vostok, in Antarctica, may have formed in a rift setting
 Þingvallavatn, in Iceland

References

 
Lakes by type